Super Junior D&E Japan Tour 2015 -Present- is the second Japan Arena tour held by Super Junior-D&E. Commenced in Saitama continued to Osaka, Nagoya and Fukuoka with 10 shows in total and attracted over 100.000 fans. They performed 24 songs within 3 hours.

Summary 
On December 20, 2014 during Super Junior's Super Show 6 in Fukuoka it's announced that their subgroup, Super Junior-D&E will hold their 2nd Japan tour. On January 13, 2015, Super Junior Japan official website confirmed this news by releasing further information about the tour. It planned for 9 shows but then the organizer added 1 more show in Fukuoka. This show end successfully and attracted about 100.000 fans.

Tour dates

Discography

Special features 
 On April 18 – 22 2015 this tour aired live at SMTown@coexartium SMTown Theatre Surround Viewing.

Personnel 
Artis: Super Junior-D&E; Donghae and Eunhyuk
Organizer tour: SM Entertainment
Promoter tour: Dream Maker

References

External links 
 Super Junior Japan Official Website 

Super Junior D&E concert tours
2015 concert tours